Lauren Hallaselkä (born 18 March 2003) is a Finnish diver. She competed in the women's 1-metre springboard event at the 2019 World Aquatics Championships. She finished in 30th place in the preliminary round.

References

External links
 

2003 births
Living people
Finnish female divers
Place of birth missing (living people)